Australian Off Road Championship (AORC) is an off-road-based rally championship held annually in Australia, with the inaugural event held in 1981. AORC events are defined as ‘long course’ events that are conducted on a track of no less than 15 kilometres in length, but are usually between 75 and 100 kilometres. The courses and tracks used for the AORC vary greatly and can be narrow, twisting and tree-lined, undulating farmland tracks, sand dunes and creek crossings, often incorporating man-made jumps and other obstacles but usually have high average speeds.

Most events run over three days with Scrutineering (safety checks on vehicles), Prologue (short time trial to determine starting order for event proper) and racing over one to two days (usually split into Sections). Most events also feature a Top Ten Shootout (opportunity for the ten fastest prologue vehicles to prologue again) and a Dash for Cash where the fastest two vehicles in each class (not involved in the Top Ten Shootout) race each other to win prize money.

To enter vehicles must comply with regulations determined by the Confederation of Australian Motorsport (CAMS). There are ten classes for vehicles.

Classes

2018 events
 St George 399 – Queensland
 Finke Desert Race – Northern Territory 
 Rainbow Desert Enduro – Victoria

List of past winners

References

External links
 Australian Off Road Championship website
 www.offroadracing.com.au/Results/Past
 2012 Australian Off Road Championship

Rally racing series
Off road
Rally competitions in Australia
Off road